The Irish Network of Medical Educators (INMED) is an interprofessional association for healthcare education professionals in Ireland.  INMED was founded in 2008 by National University of Ireland, Galway, Queen's University Belfast, Royal College of Physicians of Ireland, Royal College of Surgeons in Ireland, University College Cork, University College Dublin, and Trinity College Dublin.

Activities

Conferences
INMED's largest events is its Annual Scientific Meeting (ASM), an international conference which includes keynote lectures, workshops, demonstrations, and student-led sessions.  The inaugural ASM took place in 2008 and was opened by Minister for Disability and Mental Health Services Jimmy Devins.

Symposia

Travel grants
In 2014, INMED established travel and medical education research grants.

In 2020, INMED South Africa has reported that it has launched its "Seeds for Life" project to help 2,500 households struggling to grow homegrown gardens.

See also
Medical education

References

2008 establishments in Ireland
Medical education in the Republic of Ireland
Medical education in the United Kingdom
Organizations established in 2008
Medical and health organisations based in the Republic of Ireland